Austroaeschna ingrid is a species of large dragonfly in the family Telephlebiidae, 
known as the Grampians darner. It is known only from the Grampians in western Victoria, Australia, where it inhabits small streams and bogs.

Austroaeschna ingrid is a very dark dragonfly with pale markings. It appears similar to the S-spot darner, Austroaeschna christine, the multi-spotted darner, Austroaeschna multipunctata, and the Sydney mountain darner, Austroaeschna obscura.

Gallery

See also
 List of dragonflies of Australia

References

Telephlebiidae
Odonata of Australia
Endemic fauna of Australia
Taxa named by Günther Theischinger
Insects described in 2008